In the Bible, the name Azazel (ʿAzāʾzēl) appears in association with the scapegoat rite; the name represents a desolate place where a scapegoat bearing the sins of the Jews during Yom Kippur was sent. During the end of the Second Temple period, his association as a fallen angel responsible for introducing humans to forbidden knowledge emerged due to Hellenization, Christian narrative, and interpretation exemplified in the Book of Enoch. His role as a fallen angel partly remains in Christian and Islamic traditions.

Bible

Torah

In the Hebrew Bible, the term is used three times in Leviticus 16, where two male goats were to be sacrificed to Yahweh and one of the two was selected by lot, for Yahweh is seen as speaking through the lots. One goat is selected by lot and sent into the wilderness , "for Azazel". This goat was then cast out in the desert as part of Yom Kippur. The scapegoat ritual can be traced back to 24th century BC Ebla, from where it spread throughout the ancient Near East.

In older English versions, such as the King James Version, the phrase la-azazel is translated as "as a scapegoat"; however, in most modern English Bible translations, it is represented as a name in the text:

A b'raita, apparently interpreting azazel as az (rugged) + el (of God), understands it to refer to the rugged and rough mountain cliff from which the goat was cast down.

Gesenius also thought the term referred to the object, and emended the name to עזלזל utter removal, theoretically the name of a demon. However, neither this demon nor the root עזל (comp. אזל) are attested.

עז (ez) also generically means goat and אזל (azal) means to be gone, used up, or exhausted and the contraction could simply mean 'the goat that is expended'.

In Greek Septuagint and later translations 
The translators of the Greek Septuagint understood the Hebrew term as meaning "the sent away" (apparently reading either עז אזל goat which leaves or the mighty sent or עזלזל v.s.), and read: 

Following the Septuagint, the Latin Vulgate, Martin Luther and the King James Version also give readings such as Young's Literal Translation: "And Aaron hath given lots over the two goats, one lot for Jehovah, and one lot for a goat of departure'".

According to the Peshitta, Azazel is rendered Za-za-e'il strong one against/of God. Pesher on the Periods A (4Q180) reads, " . . . on Azazel (some read Uzael) and the angels . . ." If the name is in fact Azazel's, it is spelled עזזאל, equivalent to the Peshitta's version. Targum Neofiti reads עזזל, without the aleph.

In Judaism

Rabbinical Judaism
The Mishnah (Yoma 39a) follows the Hebrew Bible text; two goats were procured, similar in respect of appearance, height, cost, and time of selection. Having one of these on his right and the other on his left, the high priest, who was assisted in this rite by two subordinates, put both his hands into a wooden case, and took out two labels, one inscribed "for Yahweh" and the other "for Azazel". The high priest then laid his hands with the labels upon the two goats and said, "A sin-offering to Yahweh" (thus speaking the Tetragrammaton); and the two men accompanying him replied, "Blessed be the name of His glorious kingdom for ever and ever." He then fastened a scarlet woolen thread to the head of the goat "for Azazel"; and laying his hands upon it again, recited the following confession of sin and prayer for forgiveness: "O Lord, I have acted iniquitously, trespassed, sinned before Thee: I, my household, and the sons of Aaron Thy holy ones. O Lord, forgive the iniquities, transgressions, and sins that I, my household, and Aaron's children, Thy holy people, committed before Thee, as is written in the law of Moses, Thy servant, 'for on this day He will forgive you, to cleanse you from all your sins before the Lord; ye shall be clean.'"

This prayer was responded to by the congregation present. A man was selected, preferably a priest, to take the goat to the precipice in the wilderness; and he was accompanied part of the way by the most eminent men of Jerusalem. Ten booths had been constructed at intervals along the road leading from Jerusalem to the steep mountain. At each one of these the man leading the goat was formally offered food and drink, which he, however, refused. When he reached the tenth booth those who accompanied him proceeded no further, but watched the ceremony from a distance. When he came to the precipice he divided the scarlet thread into two parts, one of which he tied to the rock and the other to the goat's horns, and then pushed the goat down (Yoma vi. 1–8). The cliff was so high and rugged that before the goat had traversed half the distance to the plain below, its limbs were utterly shattered. Men were stationed at intervals along the way, and as soon as the goat was thrown down the precipice, they signaled to one another by means of kerchiefs or flags, until the information reached the high priest, whereat he proceeded with the other parts of the ritual.

In later times the change to white was not invariable: a proof of the people's moral and spiritual deterioration, that was gradually on the increase, until forty years before the destruction of the Second Temple, when the change of color was no longer observed (l.c. 39b).

Medieval Jewish commentators 
The medieval scholar Nahmanides (1194–1270) identified the Hebrew text as also referring to a demon, and identified this "Azazel" with Samael. However, he did not see the sending of the goat as honoring Azazel as a deity, but as a symbolic expression of the idea that the people's sins and their evil consequences were to be sent back to the spirit of desolation and ruin, the source of all impurity. The very fact that the two goats were presented before God, before the one was sacrificed and the other sent into the wilderness, was proof that Azazel was not ranked alongside God, but regarded simply as the personification of wickedness in contrast with the righteous government of God.

Maimonides (1134–1204) says that as sins cannot be taken off one's head and transferred elsewhere, the ritual is symbolic, enabling the penitent to discard his sins: “These ceremonies are of a symbolic character and serve to impress man with a certain idea and to lead him to repent, as if to say, ‘We have freed ourselves of our previous deeds, cast them behind our backs and removed them from us as far as possible’.”

The rite, resembling, on one hand, the sending off of the basket with the woman embodying wickedness to the land of Shinar in the vision of Zechariah, and, on the other, the letting loose of the living bird into the open field in the case of the leper healed from the plague, was, indeed, viewed by the people of Jerusalem as a means of ridding themselves of the sins of the year. So would the crowd, called Babylonians or Alexandrians, pull the goat's hair to make it hasten forth, carrying the burden of sins away with it (Yoma vi. 4, 66b; "Epistle of Barnabas," vii.), and the arrival of the shattered animal at the bottom of the valley of the rock of Bet Ḥadudo, twelve miles away from the city, was signalized by the waving of shawls to the people of Jerusalem, who celebrated the event with boisterous hilarity and amid dancing on the hills (Yoma vi. 6, 8; Ta'an. iv. 8). Evidently the figure of Azazel was an object of general fear and awe rather than, as has been conjectured, a foreign product or the invention of a late lawgiver. More as a demon of the desert, it seems to have been closely interwoven with the mountainous region of Jerusalem.

In Christianity

Latin Bible

The Vulgate contains no mention of "Azazel" but only of caper emissarius, or "emissary goat", apparently reading עז אזל goat which leaves:

English versions, such as the King James Version, followed the Septuagint and Vulgate in understanding the term as relating to a goat. The modern English Standard Version provides the footnote "16:8 The meaning of Azazel is uncertain; possibly the name of a place or a demon, traditionally a scapegoat; also verses 10, 26". Most scholars accept the indication of some kind of demon or deity, however Judit M. Blair notes that this is an argument without supporting contemporary text evidence.

Ida Zatelli (1998)  has suggested that the Hebrew ritual parallels pagan practice of sending a scapegoat into the desert on the occasion of a royal wedding found in two ritual texts in archives at Ebla (24th C. BC). A she-goat with a silver bracelet hung from her neck was driven forth into the wasteland of 'Alini' by the community. There is no mention of an "Azazel".

According to The Expositor's Bible Commentary, Azazel is the Hebrew word for scapegoat.  This is the only place that the Hebrew word is found in the whole Hebrew Old Testament.  It says that the Book of Enoch, (extra-biblical Jewish theological literature, dated around 200 B.C.) is full of demonology and reference to fallen angels.  The EBC (Vol 2) says that this text uses late Aramaic forms for these names which indicates that The Book of Enoch most likely relies upon the Hebrew Leviticus text rather than the Leviticus text being reliant upon the Book of Enoch.

Christian commentators
Origen ("Contra Celsum," vi. 43) identifies Azazel with Satan.

In Mandaeism
Azazel is occasionally mentioned as Azaziʿil in Mandaean scriptures. In the Right Ginza, Azaziʿil is the name of an uthra (celestial being or angel).

In Islam

In Islam, Azazel appears in relation to the story of Harut and Marut, a pair of angels mentioned in the Quran. Although not explained by the Quran itself, Muslim exegetes, such as Al-Kalbi and Al-Tha`labi, usually linked the reason of their abode to a narration related to the Watchers known from 3 Enoch. Just as in 3 Enoch, angels complained about humans iniquity, whereupon God offered a test, that the angels might choose three among them to descend to earth, endowed with bodily desires, and prove that they would do better than humans under the same conditions. Accordingly, they choose Aza, Azzaya and Azazel. However, Azazel repented his decision and God allowed him to turn back to heaven. The other two angels failed the test and their names were changed to Harut and Marut. They ended up on earth, introducing men to illicit magic.

Apocrypha

Enochic literature 
In the Dead Sea Scrolls, the name Azazel occurs in the line 6 of 4Q203, The Book of Giants, which is a part of the Enochic literature found at Qumran. Despite the expectation of Brandt (1889) to date no evidence has surfaced of Azazel as a demon or god prior to the earliest Jewish sources among the Dead Sea Scrolls.

The Book of Enoch brings Azazel into connection with the Biblical story of the fall of the angels, located on Mount Hermon, a gathering-place of demons of old. Here, Azazel is one of the leaders of the rebellious Watchers in the time preceding the Flood; he taught men the art of warfare, of making swords, knives, shields, and coats of mail, and taught women the art of deception by ornamenting the body, dyeing the hair, and painting the face and the eyebrows, and also revealed to the people the secrets of witchcraft and corrupted their manners, leading them into wickedness and impurity until at last he was, at Yahweh's command, bound hand and foot by the archangel Raphael and chained to the rough and jagged rocks of [Ha] Dudael (= Beth Ḥadudo), where he is to abide in utter darkness until the great Day of Judgment, when he will be cast into the fire to be consumed forever.

According to the Book of Enoch, Azazel (here spelled ‘ăzā’zyēl) was one of the chief Grigori, a group of fallen angels who married women. Many believe that this same story (without any mention of Azazel) is told in the Book of Genesis 6:2–4:

These "sons of God" have often been thought of as fallen angels, and are sometimes equated with the Nephilim. (On the other hand, it has also been argued that the phrase refers only to pious men, or else that it should be translated "sons of the rulers".)

Enoch portrays Azazel as responsible for teaching people to make weapons and cosmetics, for which he was cast out of heaven. The Book of Enoch 8:1–3a reads, "And Azazel taught men to make swords and knives and shields and breastplates; and made known to them the metals [of the earth] and the art of working them; and bracelets and ornaments; and the use of antimony and the beautifying of the eyelids; and all kinds of costly stones and all colouring tinctures. And there arose much godlessness, and they committed fornication, and they were led astray and became corrupt in all their ways." The corruption brought on by Azazel and the Grigori degrades the human race, and the four archangels (Michael, Gabriel, Raphael, and Uriel) “saw much blood being shed upon the earth and all lawlessness being wrought upon the earth […]  The souls of men [made] their suit, saying, "Bring our cause before the Most High; […] Thou seest what Azazel hath done, who hath taught all unrighteousness on earth and revealed the eternal secrets which were in heaven, which men were striving to learn." God sees the sin brought about by Azazel and has Raphael “bind Azazel hand and foot and cast him into the darkness: and make an opening in the desert – which is in Dudael – and cast him therein. And place upon him rough and jagged rocks, and cover him with darkness, and let him abide there forever, and cover his face that he may not see light.” Azazel's fate is foretold near the end of Enoch 2:8, where God says, “On the day of the great judgement he shall be cast into the fire.” He will be delivered to the angels of punishments (Satan).

Several scholars have previously discerned that some details of Azazel's punishment are reminiscent of the scapegoat rite. Thus, Lester Grabbe points to a number of parallels between the Azazel narrative in Enoch and the wording of Leviticus 16, including "the similarity of the names Asael and Azazel; the punishment in the desert; the placing of sin on Asael/Azazel; the resultant healing of the land." Daniel Stökl also observes that "the punishment of the demon resembles the treatment of the goat in aspects of geography, action, time and purpose." Thus, the place of Asael's punishment designated in Enoch as Dudael is reminiscent of the rabbinic terminology used for the designation of the ravine of the scapegoat in later rabbinic interpretations of the Yom Kippur ritual. Stökl remarks that "the name of place of judgment (Dudael) is conspicuously similar in both traditions and can likely be traced to a common origin."

Azazel in 1 Enoch has been compared to Greek Titan Prometheus. He might be a demonized counterpart of a heavenly creature, who provided knowledge for people to make weapons, thus causing bloodshed and injustice. The latter might be identified with Greek kings and generals, who suppressed the Jews with military forces, but learned how to make their weapons by this specific expelled creature.

In the fifth-century 3 Enoch, Azazel is one of the three angels (Azza [Shemhazai] and Uzza [Ouza] are the other two) who opposed Enoch's high rank when he became the angel Metatron. Whilst they were fallen at this time they were still in Heaven, but Metatron held a dislike for them, and had them cast out.

In the Apocalypse of Abraham 
In the extra-canonical text the Apocalypse of Abraham (c.1st CE), Azazel appears as an unclean bird who came down upon the sacrifice which Abraham prepared. (This is in reference to Genesis 15:11: "Birds of prey came down on the carcasses, but Abram drove them away" [NIV]).

The text also associates Azazel with the serpent and hell. In Chapter 23, verse 7, it is described as having seven heads, 14 faces, "hands and feet like a man's [and] on his back six wings on the right and six on the left."

Abraham says that the wicked will "putrefy in the belly of the crafty worm Azazel, and be burned by the fire of Azazel's tongue" (Abr. 31:5), and earlier says to Azazel himself, "May you be the firebrand of the furnace of the earth! Go, Azazel, into the untrodden parts of the earth. For your heritage is over those who are with you" (Abr. 14:5–6).

Here there is the idea that God's heritage (the created world) is largely under the dominion of evil – i.e., it is "shared with Azazel" (Abr. 20:5), again identifying him with the devil, who was called "the prince of this world" by Jesus. ( niv)

See also

 Azazel (Marvel Comics)
 Azazel in popular culture
 Baphomet
 Capricorn (astrology)
 Dudael
 Enki
 List of angels in theology
 Lucifer
 The Master and Margarita
 Palorchestes azael (Australian large extinct marsupial)
 Samael
 Samyaza
 Scapegoat
 Watcher (angel)
 Zazel (spirit)
 Zazel (erotic art film 1997)

References

Angels in Islam
Book of Leviticus
Demons in the Old Testament apocrypha
Hebrew words and phrases in the Hebrew Bible
Hell (Christianity)
Javanese folklore
Jewish underworld
Watchers (angels)
Yom Kippur
Devils
Fallen angels
Animals in the Bible
Goats
Uthras